The shou-wei hao-ma (首尾號碼) method is a lookup method for Chinese Characters developed between 1961 and 1965.  It can also be used as an Input Method Editor, for computer entry of Chinese characters and related symbols.

It represents the first two and last two strokes as numbers 0–9, building a four-digit index number that enables a quick lookup. It is based completely on the structure of the character and not on any phonetic interpretation.

This method was popularized in Taiwan, with the publication of the 'Shou-Wei Hao-ma Dictionary 首尾號碼詞典', authored by Chen Shun-Chi, 陳舜齊 and published in 1964.  This lookup method is one of the fastest for foreigners to grasp. 

The dictionary (which defined this method) also provides Bopomofo phonetic, character phonetic/homophone, CTC #, definitions, radical and strokes, synonym and antonym and character phrases.

References

The (首尾號碼) dictionary is referenced at:

http://searchworks.stanford.edu/view/4213706

Han character input